Slabcamp Run is a stream in Brown County, Ohio. It is a tributary of White Oak Creek.

According to tradition, Slabcamp Run was so named on account of the ruins of a Native American camping ground being discovered there by early white settlers.

See also
List of rivers of Ohio

References

Rivers of Brown County, Ohio
Rivers of Ohio